The 2019–20 BYU Cougars women's basketball team represented Brigham Young University during the 2019–20 NCAA Division I women's basketball season. It was head coach Jeff Judkins's nineteenth season at BYU. The Cougars, members of the West Coast Conference, play their home games at the Marriott Center.

Before the season

Departures

Newcomers

2019–20 media

BYU Sports Media

All Cougars home games are scheduled to be shown on BYUtv or on WCC Network (formerly TheW.tv). Conference road games will also be shown on WCC Network. Most regular season road games will be streamed. Streaming partners for those games can be found on the schedule.

Roster

Schedule

|-
!colspan=8 style=| Exhibition

|-
!colspan=8 style=| Non-conference regular season

|-
!colspan=8 style=| WCC regular season

|-
!colspan=8 style=| WCC Tournament

Game Summaries

Exhibition: Westminster
Broadcasters: Jason Shepherd
Starting Lineups:
Westminster: Abby Mangum, Mariah Martin, Sarah McGinley, Kaitlin Toluono, Hunter Krebs
BYU: Brenna Drollinger, Maria Albiero, Paisley Johnson, Sara Hamson, Jasmine Moody

Antelope Valley
Broadcasters: Mitchell Marshall 
Starting Lineups:
Antelope Valley: Ahjana Oakes, Serene Tyus, Tylen Price, Chinna Fair, Alexia Budd
BYU: Brenna Drollinger, Maria Albiero, Paisley Johnson, Sara Hamson, Jasmine Moody

Washington State
Broadcasters: Steve Grubbs
Series History: Series even 5–5
Starting Lineups:
BYU: Brenna Drollinger, Maria Albiero, Paisley Johnson, Sara Hamson, Jasmine Moody
Washington State: Emma Nankervis, Chanelle Molina, Shir Levy, Ula Motuga, Borislava Hristova

Texas A&M-Kingsville
Broadcasters: Spencer Linton & Kristen Kozlowski 
Series History: First Meeting 
Starting Lineups:
Texas A&M-Kingsville: Danielle Meador, Ravae Payne, Jalynn Johnson, Brynae Thompson, Maeghan Palmer
BYU: Brenna Drollinger, Maria Albiero, Paisley Johnson, Sara Hamson, Jasmine Moody

Fresno State
Broadcasters: Matt Norville
Series History: BYU leads series 7–6
Starting Lineups:
BYU: Brenna Drollinger, Shalae Salmon, Maria Albiero, Paisley Johnson, Sara Hamson
Fresno State: Hanna Cavinder, Haley Cavinder, Madi Utti, Brooke Walling, Aly Gamez

Utah State
Broadcasters: Spencer Linton & Kristen Kozlowski 
Series History: BYU leads series 36–4 
Starting Lineups:
Utah State: Faith Brantley, Steph Gorman, Lindsey Jensen-Baker, Hailey Bassett, Marlene Aniambossou
BYU: Brenna Drollinger, Shalae Salmon, Maria Albiero, Paisley Johnson, Sara Hamson

Utah
Broadcasters: Dave McCann & Kristen Kozlowski
Series History: Utah leads series 65–42
Starting Lineups:
Utah: Dru Gylten, Brynna Maxwell, Lola Pendande, Kemery Martin, Ola Makurat
BYU: Brenna Drollinger, Shalae Salmon, Maria Albiero, Paisley Johnson, Sara Hamson

Arizona State
Broadcasters:  Alexander Gaul, Sophia Elenga, & Misha Jones
Series History: BYU leads series 6–3 
Starting Lineups: 
BYU: Brenna Drollinger, Shalae Salmon, Maria Albiero, Paisley Johnson, Sara Hamson
Arizona State: Taya Hanson, Reili Richardson, Robbi Ryan, Jayde Van Hyfte, Ja'Tavia Tapley

Boise State
Broadcasters: Chris Lewis
Series History: BYU leads series 11–7
Starting Lineups:
BYU: Brenna Drollinger, Shalae Salmon, Maria Albiero, Paisley Johnson, Sara Hamson
Boise State: Braydey Hodgins, Riley Lupfer, Jayde Christopher, A'Shanti Coleman, Mallory McGwire

Utah Valley
Broadcasters:  Spencer Linton, Kristen  Kozlowski, & Jason Shepherd 
Series History: BYU leads series 9–0 
Starting Lineups: 
Utah Valley: Maria Carvalho, Eve Braslis, Nehaa Sohail, Jordan Holland, Josie Williams
BYU: Brenna Drollinger, Shalae Salmon, Maria Albiero, Paisley Johnson, Sara Hamson

San Jose State
Broadcasters: Spencer Linton (BYU Radio)
Series History: BYU leads series 3–2
Starting Lineups:
San Jose State: Raziya Potter, Fieme'a Hafoka, Tyra Whitehead, Danae Marquez, Megan Anderson
BYU: Brenna Drollinger, Shalae Salmon, Maria Albiero, Paisley Johnson, Sara Hamson

Oregon State
Broadcasters:  Ron Callan (P12+ OSU) Spencer Linton (BYU Radio)
Series History: Oregon State leads series 6–4 
Starting Lineups: 
BYU: Brenna Drollinger, Shalae Salmon, Maria Albiero, Paisley Johnson, Sara Hamson
Oregon State: Mikayla Pivec, Aleah Goodman, Destiny Slocum, Kennedy Brown, Taylor Jones

Loyola Marymount
Broadcasters: No commentary
Series History: BYU leads series 15–2
Starting Lineups:
BYU: Brenna Drollinger, Maria Albiero, Paisley Johnson, Sara Hamson, Jasmine Moody
Loyola Marymount: Aspyn Adams, Ciera Ellington, Chelsey Gipson, Raychel Stanley, Meghan Mandel

Pepperdine
Broadcasters:  Darren Preston
Series History: BYU leads series 19–3 
Starting Lineups: 
BYU: Brenna Drollinger, Maria Albiero, Paisley Johnson, Sara Hamson, Jasmine Moody
Pepperdine: Malia Bambrick, Paige Fecske, Monique Andriuolo, Barbara Sitanggan, Hannah Friend

Gonzaga
Broadcasters: Spencer Linton, Kristen Kozlowski, & Jason Shepherd
Series History: Gonzaga leads series 15–12
Starting Lineups:
Gonzaga: Jenn Wirth, LeeAnne Wirth, Jessie Lorea, Katie Campbell
BYU: Brenna Drollinger, Maria Albiero, Paisley Johnson, Sara Hamson, Jasmine Moody

Portland
Broadcasters:  Spencer Linton, Kristen Kozlowski, & Jason Shepherd
Series History: BYU leads series 24–4 
Starting Lineups: 
Portland: Kate Andersen, Haylee Andrews, Alex Fowler, Maddie Muhlheim, Lauren Walker
BYU: Brenna Drollinger, Maria Albiero, Paisley Johnson, Sara Hamson, Jasmine Moody

San Diego
Broadcasters: Spencer Linton & Kristen Kozlowski
Series History: BYU leads series 12–6
Starting Lineups:
San Diego: Myah Pace, Madison Pollock, Jordyn Edwards, Sydney Hunter, Patricia Brossman
BYU: Brenna Drollinger, Maria Albiero, Paisley Johnson, Babalu Ugwu, Sara Hamson

Pacific
Broadcasters:  Don Gubbins
Series History: BYU leads series 13–4 
Starting Lineups: 
BYU: Brenna Drollinger, Maria Albiero, Paisley Johnson, Babalu Ugwu, Sara Hamson
Pacific: Brooklyn McDavid, Jessica Blakeslee, Kaylin Randhawa, Valerie Higgins, Lianna Tillman

Saint Mary's
Broadcasters: Brandon Gutierrez 
Series History: Saint Mary's leads series 10–9
Starting Lineups:
BYU: Brenna Drollinger, Maria Albiero, Babalu Ugwu, Leilani Otuafi, Sara Hamson
Saint Mary's: Taycee Wedin, Madeline Holland, Tyra Moe, Sam Simons, Brianna Simonich

San Francisco
Broadcasters:  Spencer Linton & Kristen Kozlowski
Series History: BYU leads series 19–5 
Starting Lineups: 
San Francisco: Mikayla Williams, Kia Vaalavirta, Lucie Hoskova, Leilah Vigil, Abby Rathbun
BYU: Brenna Drollinger, Maria Albiero, Paisley Johnson, Babalu Ugwu, Sara Hamson

Santa Clara
Broadcasters: Spencer Linton & Kristen Kozlowski
Series History: BYU leads series 17–2
Starting Lineups:
Santa Clara: Addi Walters, Naomi Jimenez, Ashlyn Herlihy, Lindsey VanAllen, Emily Wolph
BYU: Brenna Drollinger, Maria Albiero, Paisley Johnson, Babalu Ugwu, Sara Hamson

Portland
Broadcasters:  Bryan Sleik & Jazmine Dallas 
Series History: BYU leads series 24–5 
Starting Lineups: 
BYU: Brenna Drollinger, Maria Albiero, Paisley Johnson, Babalu Ugwu, Sara Hamson
Portland: Kate Andersen, Haylee Andrews, Alex Fowler, Maddie Muhlheim, Lauren Walker

Gonzaga
Broadcasters: Sam Adams & Michelle Clark
Series History: Gonzaga leads series 16–12
Starting Lineups:
BYU: Brenna Drollinger, Maria Albiero, Paisley Johnson, Babalu Ugwu, Sara Hamson
Gonzaga: Jenn Wirth, LeeAnne Wirth, Jessie Loera, Katie Campbell, Jill Townsend

San Diego
Broadcasters: Paula Bott
Series History: BYU leads series 13–6
Starting Lineups:
BYU: Brenna Drollinger, Maria Albiero, Paisley Johnson, Babalu Ugwu, Sara Hamson
San Diego: Myah Pace, Madison Pollock, Jordyn Edwards, Sydney Hunter, Patricia Brossman

Saint Mary's
Broadcasters: Spencer Linton & Kristen Kozlowski
Series History: Series even 10–10
Starting Lineups:
Saint Mary's: Taycee Wedin, Madeline Holland, Sam Simons, Brianna Simonich, Claire Ferguson
BYU: Brenna Drollinger, Maria Albiero, Paisley Johnson, Babalu Ugwu, Sara Hamson

Pacific
Broadcasters:  
Series History: BYU leads series 14–4 
Starting Lineups: 
Pacific: 
BYU:

Santa Clara
Broadcasters: 
Series History: BYU leads series 18–2
Starting Lineups:
BYU: 
Santa Clara:

San Francisco
Broadcasters: George Devine & Amy Touli 
Series History: BYU leads series 20–5 
Starting Lineups: 
BYU: 
San Francisco:

Pepperdine
Broadcasters:  
Series History: BYU leads series 20–3 
Starting Lineups: 
Pepperdine: 
BYU:

Loyola Marymount
Broadcasters: 
Series History: BYU leads series 16–2
Starting Lineups:
Loyola Marymount: 
BYU:

Rankings
2019–20 NCAA Division I women's basketball rankings

References

BYU Cougars women's basketball seasons
BYU
BYU Cougars
BYU Cougars